Nisipuri may refer to several villages in Romania:

 Nisipuri, a village in Ulmi Commune, Dâmboviţa County
 Nisipuri, a village in Dobroteşti Commune, Dolj County